Torigni-sur-Vire (literally Torigni on Vire) is a former commune in the Manche department, Normandy, northwestern France. On 1 January 2016, it was merged into the new commune of Torigny-les-Villes.

Heraldry

See also
Communes of the Manche department

References 

Torignisurvire